The Wasted Times is a 2016 Chinese-Hong Kong thriller film directed by Cheng Er and starring Ge You, Zhang Ziyi and Tadanobu Asano. It was released in China and the United States on December 16, 2016.

Plot
The movie depicts events commencing prior to the Japanese occupation of Shanghai between 1934 and the end of the war in 1945.  The story arcs are told in a non-linear fashion and many events are re-told revealing the truth of what actually occurred. The central characters are a Chinese crime figure, Lu (Ge You) and his Japanese brother-in-law, Watabe (Tadanobu Asano).

The initial arc starts in Shanghai in 1937 in the eve of the Japanese invasion of Shanghai. Lu is introduced as an influential crime boss who works for Mr. Dai (Dahong Ni). His brother-in-law is Watabe who has two children and runs a local Japanese restaurant. There is tension between Japanese army as they wish for Dai and another local industrialist Zhang to support a Japanese bank being opened in Shanghai. Lu refuses but Zhang betrays him and sides with the Japanese, killing Lu's gang and family in the process. This results in a shootout in Watabe's restaurant with Watabe saving Lu's life by shooting one of the Japanese leaders, and in the process getting shot in the chest himself. Lu's sister is also killed and Lu takes charge of the two children and leaves Shanghai.

The second arc begins three years earlier and introduces Xiao Liu (Zhang Ziyi), who is married to Dai.  Xiao Liu is a bored film actress who continues to have affairs much to the embarrassment of Mr. Dai.  Lu is called upon to take care of the situation and cannot bring himself to kill Xiao Liu.  Eventually they decide to move Xiao Liu out of Shanghai to northern China to save face for Dai.  Watabe was assigned to take her to a train station in Suzhou.

The third arc in the story involves Wu (Yuan Quan) a famous actress.  Wu's husband is also an actor but is not particular successful or good.  Wu's husband is arrested by local police and she enlists the help of Mr. Dai.  Mr. Dai is smitten by Wu.  Wu is offered a high paying position for her husband outside of Shanghai with the implicit understanding that Wu would become Dai's mistress.  She tries to reject the offer but is devastated when she learns her husband has accepted the offer already.
 
The next arc occurs 1941 in Hong Kong just prior to the Pacific War. Lu has settled there with Watabe's sons.  Zhang who had betrayed Lu previously has been tracked down.  Lu orders Zhang's assassination but in the process sacrifices Xiao Wu (Gillian Chung) his mistress.

The next arc of the story revisits the events of the shoot out and we learn that Watabe was not killed.  We learned that he was sent by the Japanese army to infiltrate Shanghai and had been working with the Japanese to prepare for the invasion of Shanghai.  He maintained his front of being a loyal family man but secretly continued to keep Xiao Liu imprisoned as a sex slave.  After the events of shootout (and the subsequent occupation of Shanghai) Watabe reveals his Japanese persona and continues to keep Liu as a servant and sexual object.  Watabe is sent to the frontlines and intends to kill Xiao Liu before he leaves.  However he is not able to bring himself finish the act.  Watabe is eventually taken as a prisoner of war in the Philippines in 1944.

The final arc of the story occurs just after the surrender of the Japanese in September 1945.  Lu is in Shanghai in a post war asylum.  He is taken to Xiao Liu.  Xiao Liu recognizes Lu and smiles and goes to greet him.  Lu remains stone faced and they leave the asylum together with Liu walking behind Lu.  Lu is now at the POW camp where Watabe is kept in the Philippines.  Lu wishes to extradite Watabe but Watabe has to sign a consent.  Lu meets Watabe and presents him with the consent papers.  Watabe spits on the papers (knowing full well he will be released back to Japan).  Lu directs Watabe to look out the window where they see Xiao Liu with his two sons in the distance outside the camp.  Watabe laughs in Lu's face saying he knows them and that they won't do anything to hurt his sons.  Xiao Liu shoots and kill the older boy.  Watabe relents and signs the consent forms.  He is taken outside of the POW camp to where Xiao Liu and his remaining son is.  Watabe tells his son to go to the POW camp and to tell them he is Japanese.  The boy complies and is taken into the camp.  Xiao Liu then shoots and kills Watabe.
In the final scene, Lu is seen returning to Hong Kong alone.

Cast

Ge You as Mister Lu
Zhang Ziyi as Xiao Liu
Tadanobu Asano as Watabe
Gillian Chung as Xiao Wu
Du Chun as Killer
Ni Dahong
Yuan Quan
Yan Ni
Zhao Baogang
Han Geng
Huo Siyan
Wallace Chung
Wang Chuanjun
Du Jiang
Lv Xing
Ash Gordey

Release
The film was previously scheduled for release in China on October 3, 2015. It was released in China on December 16, 2016.

Awards and nominations

Reception
The film has grossed  in China. According to the review aggregator website Rotten Tomatoes, 20% of critics have given the film a positive review based on 5 reviews, with an average rating of 5.5/10.

References

External links

2016 films
Chinese thriller films
2016 thriller films
Huayi Brothers films
Films set in Shanghai
Films shot in Shanghai
Hong Kong thriller films
Films scored by Shigeru Umebayashi
Shanghainese-language films
2010s Mandarin-language films
Films directed by Cheng Er
Second Sino-Japanese War films
2010s Hong Kong films